Alive and Kicking is a 2016 American documentary film about swing dancing, its origins in Harlem, and its rebirth starting in the 1990s. It is directed/produced by Susan Glatzer. The film premiered at the 2016 SXSW Film Festival and was subsequently acquired by Magnolia Pictures. The executive producers were Jason Blum and Robert Rippberger.

Cast

Reception
On review aggregator website Rotten Tomatoes, the film has an approval rating of 100 percent based on 11 critics, with an average rating of 7.50 out of 10.

Both Sheri Linden of the Los Angeles Times and Christopher Kompanek of The Washington Post have praised writing and directing by Susan Glatzer.

Serena Donadoni of The Village Voice stated that "Although it's been used repeatedly as a movie title, Alive and Kicking perfectly captures the joyous enthusiasm of Susan Glatzer's debut documentary, which presents swing dance as a vibrant, living art form".

According to Moira MacDonald of the Seattle Times "Though it adheres to documentary convention by picking out a few competitive swing dancers and following them throughout the film, "Alive and Kicking" keeps dancing off into other areas, and we just hold its hand and follow".

While attending its premiere at the SXSW, Wayne Alan Brenner of The Austin Chronicle wrote "The music, the interviews, the interleavening of stock footage, the way the various modern narratives and backgrounding histories are fitted together: All of this works toward a successful expression of what means a thing because it does have that swing".

References

External links

2016 documentary films
Documentary films about dance
American documentary films
Blumhouse Productions films
Swing dancing
2010s English-language films
2010s American films